
Gmina Rusinów is a rural gmina (administrative district) in Przysucha County, Masovian Voivodeship, in east-central Poland.

Villages
Gmina Rusinów contains the villages and settlements of Bąków, Bąków-Kolonia, Brogowa, Gałki, Grabowa, Karczówka, Klonowa, Krzesławice, Nieznamierowice, Przystałowice Małe, Rusinów, Władysławów, Wola Gałecka and Zychorzyn.

Neighbouring gminas
Gmina Rusinów is bordered by the gminas of Drzewica, Gielniów, Klwów, Odrzywół, Potworów and Przysucha.

References
Polish official population figures 2006

Rusinow
Przysucha County